The Handwara massacre was a massacre of 21 unarmed protesters by the Border Security Force of India in the town of Handwara, Kashmir on 25 January 1990.

Background
On 21 January 1990, Central Reserve Police Force opened fire on a group of protesters on the Gawkadal bridge. The Gawkadal Massacre killed 50 civilians.

Massacre
On 25 January 1990, At around 11 AM 10,000 people were marching in the town of Handwara to protest the Gawkadal massacre which had occurred four days earlier. At around that time, a Border Security Force Tata 407 attempted to dive through the protest, the protests blocked the path of the vehicle. In response, the BSF opened fire on the crowd and continued firing until 2:00 PM local time. After the massacre, the dead were piled in a tin shed near the Handwara district hospital. The massacre killed 21 people and injured 75 others.

References

Massacres in Jammu and Kashmir
1990 in India